Bob 'Elvis' Gratton is a fictional character, the subject of multiple films and a television series of the same name by Quebec director Pierre Falardeau: a series of short films (Elvis Gratton, 1981; Les Vacances d'Elvis Gratton, 1983; Pas encore Elvis Gratton!, 1985) released on VHS as the single 1985 film Elvis Gratton: Le king des kings, and then two sequels: Elvis Gratton II: Miracle à Memphis (1999) and Elvis Gratton 3: La vengeance d'Elvis Wong (2004). Most recently, a television series entitled Bob Gratton: Ma Vie/My Life began on January 15, 2007, and finished its third and final season in 2009.

Plot
The first film revolves around one Bob Gratton (played by Julien Poulin, who co-wrote and co-directed the films with Falardeau) and his passion for Elvis Presley. Gratton's life goal is to win fame as an Elvis impersonator, and he achieves it through a local TV talent show contest whose prize is a cruise to the fictional island resort of Santa Banana. After his return from Santa Banana Gratton is called on to don his Elvis costume one more time, but because he has gained weight in the interim, he has trouble fitting into it and collapses on stage during a performance, seemingly dead. In the film's final scene, just as Gratton's casket is taken for interment Bob emerges from it, quite alive.

The second film revolves around Gratton's later adventures after being discovered by a talent scout, and his rise to fame as a pop music star.

The third installment sees Gratton become the head of a media company and play an active role in manipulating the news that his media empire puts out.

Political context
In the 1980s, Falardeau and Poulin were very clear as to the goal of the early short films which constituted the first instalment of Elvis Gratton: the intent was to portray (via parody) Falardeau's and Poulin's view of the mindset that they believed had driven a majority of Québécois to vote for the No side of the 1980 referendum on Quebec sovereignty. Gratton is portrayed as fat and uneducated, but also conservative, pro-American, racist and federalist. The films' comical situations are premised on Gratton's tacky (quétaine) character and backward-thinking views, with which Falardeau and Poulin sought to associate Quebec federalists more generally. Years later, Falardeau would reveal that he regretted the movie's focus on slapstick comedy and the protagonist's constant comic relief which, in his eyes, removed the underlying message of the movie and made the movie popular only for its jokes. In Falardeau's views on Quebec federalists that Gratton is a local entrepreneur, employs a few workers but has other goals in life, like becoming famous all around the world (even with no talent) and most importantly being loved by the world. For example, in the second movie the character accepts all offers and signs all contracts possible (without reading them) in the hope of these goals, even if that's the best way to go bankrupt. Having to be loved by others is linked with Falardeau's view of federalists.

Falardeau's motivation to create a second Elvis Gratton movie started in the 1990s, when Falardeau sought financing for his February 15, 1839 (15 février 1839) film project showing aspects of the Lower Canada Rebellion. Since this film was about Quebec's history, Falardeau had been collecting donations for some time until it was suggested that a new Elvis Gratton movie would most likely be a hit and garner sufficient funds. The exercise indeed proved fruitful, and 15 février 1839 was released later in 2001.

Cast

Other appearances
Elvis Gratton showed up (remarkably un-politicised) in 1996 in an ad campaign as the year's spokesman for Opération Nez rouge (Operation Red Nose), a local initiative in Québec to provide a free driving service to take party-goers' cars back home during the holidays (along with said party-goers). Opération Nez Rouge has a history of using different humorists and/or characters each year to promote its activities.

References

External links
 
 
 
 Photos and videos from Elvis Gratton XXX: La Vengeance d'Elvis Wong on the official director's blog

Quebec films
Canadian comedy films
Canadian film series
Films shot in Montreal
Elvis impersonators
Fictional characters based on real people
Best Theatrical Short Film Genie and Canadian Screen Award winners
Films directed by Pierre Falardeau
French-language Canadian films